The Indonesia Project is a center of research and graduate training on the Indonesian economy at the Australian National University (ANU). It is located in the Arndt-Corden Department of Economics, Crawford School of Public Policy, part of the ANU College of Asia and the Pacific in Canberra. It was established in 1965 with an initial grant from the Ford Foundation.

History
In 1963, when he became head of the Department of Economics in the Research School of Pacific Studies, Professor Heinz W. Arndt decided to devote substantial resources from the new department to the study of the Indonesian economy.   He worked to recruit research fellows and doctoral students, built up relationships with numerous Indonesian institutions and international academics and initiated a publication program. These initiatives quickly matured into the Indonesia Project. As part of the activities of the project, the academic journal the Bulletin of Indonesian Economic Studies (BIES) was established in 1965. Several academic staff were recruited to work on the Indonesian economy including Dr. David Penny and Professor J. Panglaykim.  Among the young scholars awarded scholarships to work on various aspects of the Indonesian economy shortly after the establishment of the project were Anne Booth, Howard Dick, Stephen Grenville, Hal Hill, Chris Manning, Peter McCawley and Phyllis Rosendale.  In 2015, speaking at the 50th-anniversary celebration of the Project in Canberra, the then-Chancellor of the Australian National University, Gareth Evans, spoke of his own long involvement with Indonesia and said that Arndt's original idea of establishing the Indonesia Project was a "wonderfully visionary decision".

Activities
The Indonesia Project has sponsored many activities related to studies of the Indonesian economy since the mid-1960s. These include the following:

 Support for the Bulletin of Indonesian Economic Studies (BIES), published three times each year. Professor Arndt was the editor of the BIES from 1965 to 1980. His successors as editor were Professors Anne Booth and Hal Hill and Associate Professors Ross McLeod and Pierre van der Eng. The current editors are Associate Professors Blane Lewis and Arianto Patunru.
 The Indonesia Update Conference, held annually at the ANU since 1983.
 The Indonesia Study Group  at the ANU which meets around 40 times each year to discuss a wide range of topics relating to Indonesian studies.
 The Forum Kajian Pembangunan (Development Studies Forum)  which is a series of regular Jakarta seminars held with partner agencies to discuss development issues.
 Support for active links with scholarly institutions in Indonesia such as the Centre for Strategic and International Studies (CSIS), the Institute for Social and Economic Research  at the Economics Faculty, University of Indonesia, the  SMERU research institute, and the Economics Faculty, Gadjah Mada University, in Yogyakarta.
 The annual Sadli Memorial Lecture in Jakarta.
 The Indonesia Project blog.
A wide range of other meetings and conferences, both at the ANU, at other universities in Australia and Indonesia, and with public and private organisations in Australia in Indonesia.
An active program of public outreach; staff and students in the project often contribute to media comment in Australia and overseas, and often provide blog commentary on current developments in Indonesia.

During the early years after the Indonesia Project was established, the main activities focused on economic issues in Indonesia. Later, and especially after Professor J.A.C. Mackie became head of the Department of Political and Social Change at the ANU in 1980, the activities of the Indonesia project widened to include issues in other areas such as politics, government, social studies, and a range of other topics.  Senior staff of the Department of Political and Social Change such as Professor Ed Aspinall and Associate Professor Greg Fealy, and of the School of Culture, History and Language at the ANU such as Dr Marcus Mietzner and Professor Kathryn Robinson, are now involved with Indonesia Project events.

The Indonesia Project has an active policy of working in close partnership with Indonesian colleagues.  Well-known Indonesian scholars and public policy makers who have worked with the project since the mid-1960s include Professor Armida Alisjahbana, Professor Boediono, Dr Hadi Soesastro, Professor Anwar Nasution, Dr Muhamad Chatib Basri, Professor Mari Pangestu, Professor Panglaykim, Professor Mubyarto, Professor Mohamad Sadli, Dr Sri Mulyani Indrawati, and Dr Thee Kian Wie.

Management of the Project
Professor Arndt led the Indonesia Project from its inception until 1980. Peter McCawley took over management from 1980 to 1986, followed by Professor Hal Hill from 1986 to 1998, Associate Professor Chris Manning from 1998 to 2011, and then Professor Budy P. Resosudarmo from 2011 to 2017.  Blane Lewis is the current Head of the Project. Dr Robert Sparrow is the Project's Research Coordinator and Dr Arianto Patunru is the Project's Policy Engagement Coordinator.

The Project has received strong external funding support from both the  Australian Department of Foreign Affairs (DFAT)  and AusAID for many years. The staff of the Indonesia Project cooperate closely with DFAT staff in both Canberra and in Jakarta

Further reading
 Colin Brown. 2015. Australia's Indonesia Project: 50 Years of Engagement.  Manuka, ACT: Bobby Graham Publishers.
 Gareth Evans. 2015. The ANU Indonesia Project: Fifty Years Young, 30 July, Gareth Evans website.

References

External links
 Indonesia Project
 Indonesia Update page
 Indonesia Study Group page
 Indonesia Project Blog page
 Annual Sadli Lecture in Jakarta

Australian National University
Economic research institutes
Economy of Indonesia
Australia–Indonesia relations